Michel aus Lönneberga (or Emil i Lönneberga) is a German-Swedish television adaptation of Astrid Lindgren's novel series Emil i Lönneberga.

External links
 

Television shows based on works by Astrid Lindgren
1973 Swedish television series debuts
1970s Swedish television series
1973 German television series debuts
1973 German television series endings